Picciola serenata (little serenade) in B-flat major is a serenade written by Italian composer Antonio Salieri scored for five instruments: 2 oboes, 2 horns and 1 bassoon. The piece was  composed in 1778 and consists of four movements.

Background 
Salieri wrote Picciola Serenata in B-flat major in 1778. The piece was written at the beginning of his Italian tour, and shortly after he had been appointed the director of the Italian opera in 1774. Salieris success as a composer was approaching its peak, as his music quietly faded in popularity into the beginning of the 1800s.

It wasn't until the 20th century that Salieri resurged in popularity, namely due to the depiction of Salieri in Peter Shaffer's 1979 play 'Amadeus', which was later adapted into the film by the same name.

Instrumentation
'Picciola Serenata in B-flat major' is scored for 2 oboes, 2 horns and 1 bassoon.

Movements
The serenade is in four movements as follows: 
I. Allegretto
II. Larghetto
III. Minuetto - Allegro non troppo
IV. Presto

I. Allegretto 

The opening movement begins with a stately entrance in B flat major in which the two oboes present the motive while the bassoon and two horns provide a strong foundation of the tonic chord on the downbeat. In measure 25, the piece modulates to F major, using the same material from the opening. The piece uses strong use of the tonic and dominant chord.

II. Larghetto 

Keeping with the exalted feel of the first movement, the second movement opens with the melody in the horn, the other instruments accompanying with eighth notes in a 6:8 meter. The majority of this movement is in F major, usually and often modulating to the dominant key of C major. The movement ends in the key of F major.

III. Minuetto - Allegro non troppo 

The third movement is a minuet in 3:4, which is very common for a four movement serenade. The movements tonal center is B flat major. This movement takes many harmonic and melodic elements from the first two, namely the frequent modulation to the tonic key and chromatic passing tones. Similar to the first movement and unlike the second, the piece uses first and second oboes to carry most of the melodic content, while the horns and bassoon provide harmony and counterpoint.

IV. Presto 

The fourth movement, 'Presto' is the final movement of the piece. Again, we see a lot of the same compositional devices being used here. It frequently plays within the tonic or dominant triad. Towards the end of the movement, there is a cadenza in the first oboe all centered around the V chord of F major. After which, the piece returns to the opening material of the movement, ending in B flat major.

See also 
 Antonio Salieri
List of compositions by Antonio Salieri

References
Cited sources
 Rice, John A. "Chapter 8 - Italy, 1778 -80." Antonio Salieri and Viennese Opera. Chicago, IL: U of Chicago, 1998. N. pag. Print.

External links
Scores
Complete Score of 'Picciola Serenata in B-flat major'

Video performances
I. Allegretto
II. Larghetto
III. Minuetto - Allegro non troppo
IV. Presto

Serenades
Compositions by Antonio Salieri